Złombol (English "junkbol"; "złom" means junk) is a charity car rally racing event with a starting point in Poland. The goal of the rally is to finish about 2500 km over a number of stages using a car that was built or designed during the communist era. The rally takes place each year in July, August or September. The starting point is always Katowice.

The 2015 event has been called the largest charity car rally in Europe. The 2020 event has been postponed for 2021, due to the COVID-19 pandemic.

History 
The rally was conceived in 2007 by two friends as an idea to travel a very long distance in a very old car, and to use that event to gather funds for an orphanage. In the first event there were only two teams.

1 EUR = 4 zł

Charity 
Teams taking part in the rally are gathering money for orphanages by selling advertising space on their cars. Each team has to acquire donors to reach a target amount specified each year by the organisers. Teams are self-funded and no sponsorship is allowed.

Additional donations, without selling ad space, are allowed. The gathered amount of money is used for supporting orphanages.

The rally 
Złombol is an extreme rally. Teams have no support or help from the organisers. The organisers only suggest places or camping spots for a night's rest. Each team takes part at their own expense and risk.

Only cars manufactured in the former Eastern Bloc (during the communist era or after the transformation of 1989, but having roots in the former) are allowed to take part in the competition. The car should be bought for less than 1000 zł (about 320 USD), but slight alterations are allowed.

Participants drive on public roads, either travel in small groups or individually, whatever the team's preference is. For each stage starting and destination points are specified with teams free to choose the travel route between those two points.

After reaching the finish line, each team travels back to their own homes.

References

External links 
 Official website
 Złombol in media (pl)

Rally competitions in Poland
Katowice
European auto racing series
2008 establishments in Poland
2008 in motorsport